Mu'tazilism was a theological movement that appeared in early Islamic history and flourished in Basra and Baghdad (8th–10th century). Its adherents, the Mutazila or Mutazilites, were known for their neutrality in the dispute between Ali and his opponents after the death of the third caliph, Uthman. By the 10th century the term al-muʿtazilah had come to refer to a distinctive Islamic school of speculative theology (kalām).

The later Mu'tazila school developed an Islamic type of rationalism, partly influenced by Ancient Greek philosophy, based around three fundamental principles: the oneness (Tawhid) and justice (Al-'adl) of God, human freedom of action, and the creation of the Quran. The Muʿtazilites are best known for rejecting the doctrine of the Quran as uncreated and co-eternal with God, asserting that if the Quran is the literal word of God, he logically "must have preceded his own speech". This went against the orthodox Sunni position (followed by the Ashʿarī, Māturīdī and the Traditionalist (Athari) schools) which argued that with God being all-knowing, his knowledge of the Quran must have been eternal, hence uncreated just like him. Furthermore adherents to the statement that the Quran is created would mean that the Quran, hence the Sharia was created for a certain time and place only - in this case only during the lifetime of the Prophet Muhammad. This ultimately meant that the Sharia could potentially change in time and place, especially if a certain law did not go in line with akl (reason). 

The school worked to resolve the theological "problem of evil", 
arguing that since God is just and wise, he cannot command what is contrary to reason or act with disregard for the welfare of His creatures; consequently evil must be regarded as something that stems from errors in human acts, arising from man's divinely bestowed free will.
The Mu’tazila opposed secular rationalism, but believed that human intelligence and reason allowed Man to understand religious principles; that good and evil are rational categories that could be "established through unaided reason".

The movement reached its political height during the Abbasid Caliphate during the "mihna", an 18-year period (833–851 CE) of religious persecution instituted by the 'Abbasid Caliph al-Ma'mun where religious scholars were punished, imprisoned, or even killed unless they conformed to Muʿtazila doctrine, until it was reversed by al-Mutawakkil. 

In contemporary Salafi jihadism, "Muʿtazilite" is used as an epithet by rival groups hoping to undermine each others' credibility. The North African "Institute for the Faith Brigades" denounced Bin Laden's "misguided errors" and accused Abu Hafs al Mawritani, a leading figure in Al-Qaeda's juridical committee, of being a Muʿtazilite.

Name
The name Muʿtazili is derived from the reflexive stem VIII (iftaʿala) of the triconsonantal root ع-ز-ل "separate, segregate, retire", as in  iʿtazala "to separate (oneself); to withdraw from".

The name is derived from the founder's "withdrawal" from the study circle of Hasan al-Basri over a theological disagreement: Wāṣil ibn ʿAṭā' asked about the legal state of a sinner: is a person who has committed a serious sin a believer or an unbeliever? Hasan answered the person remains a Muslim. Wasil dissented, suggesting that a sinner was neither a believer nor an unbeliever and withdrew from the study circle. Others followed to form a new circle, including ʿAmr ibn ʿUbayd. Hasan's remark, "Wāṣil has withdrawn from us", is said to be the origin of the movement's name.

The group later referred to themselves as Ahl al-Tawḥīd wa l-ʿAdl ("people of monotheism and justice", and the name muʿtazili was first used by its opponents.

The verb iʿtazala is also used to designate a neutral party in a dispute (as in "withdrawing" from a dispute between two factions). According to the Encyclopædia Britannica, "The name [Mutazilah] first appears in early Islāmic history in the dispute over ʿAlī's leadership of the Muslim community after the assassination of Uthman, the third caliph, in 656 CE. Those who would neither condemn nor sanction ʿAlī or his opponents but took a middle position were termed the Muʿtazilah." Carlo Alfonso Nallino argued that the theological Mu'tazilism of Wasil and his successors was merely a continuation of this initial political Mu'tazilism.

History

Origin
Muʿtazili appeared in early Islāmic history in the dispute over Alī's leadership of the Muslim community after the death of the third caliph, Uthman. Those who would neither condemn nor sanction ʿAlī or his opponents but took a middle position between him and his opponents at the battle of Siffin and the battle of Jamal were termed the Muʿtazila. By the 10th century CE the term had also come to refer to an Islamic school of speculative theology (kalām) that flourished in Basra and Baghdad (8th–10th century).

According to Sunni sources, Muʿtazili theology originated in the eighth century in Basra (now in Iraq) when Wāṣil ibn ʿAṭā' (died 131 AH/748 AD) left the teaching lessons of Hasan al-Basri after a theological dispute regarding the issue of al-Manzilah bayna al-Manzilatayn (a position between two positions). Though Muʿtazilis later relied on logic and different aspects of early Islamic philosophy, ancient Greek philosophy, and Indian philosophy, the basics of Islam were their starting point and ultimate reference.
The accusations leveled against them by rival schools of theology that they gave absolute authority to extra-Islamic paradigms reflect more the fierce polemics between various schools of theology than any objective reality. For instance, most Muʿtazilis adopted the doctrine of creation ex nihilo, contrary to certain Muslim philosophers who, with the exception of al-Kindi, believed in the eternity of the world in some form or another.

Mu'tazili theology faced implacable opposition from Hanbali and Zahiri traditionalists , on the one hand, and from the Ash'ari school (founded by a former Mu'tazili, Abu al Hasan al-Ash'ari) and Maturidi theologians on the other.

Ahl al-kalām
Scholar Daniel W. Brown describes the Muʿtazili as "the later ahl al-kalām", suggesting the ahl al-kalām were forerunners of the Muʿtazili. The ahl al-kalām are remembered in Islamic history as opponents of Al-Shafi‘i and his principle that the final authority of Islam was the hadith of Muhammad, so that even the Qur'an was "to be interpreted in the light of [the hadith], and not vice versa." Ahl al-kalām argued to the contrary, that the book of God was an explanation of everything, and that verses in the Qur'an ordering Muslims to obey the Messenger meant that Muslims should obey the Qur'an, which God had revealed through Muhammad.

Historical development

Abu al-Hudhayl al-'Allaf (died 235 AH/849 AD), who lived a few generations after Wāṣil ibn ʿAtāʾ (واصل بن عطاء) and ʿAmr ibn ʿUbayd, is considered the theologian who systematized and formalized Muʿtazilism in Basra. Another branch of the school found a home in Baghdad under the direction of Bishr ibn al-Mu'tamir (died 210 AH/825 AD); the instigators thought it was the Caliph's own scheme: under al-Ma'mun (813–833), "Muʿtazilism became the established faith.”

Umayyad Caliphs who were known for supporting the Mu’tazila include Hisham ibn Abd al-Malik and Yazid III.

The Muʿtazilites maintained man's creation of free will, as did the Qadarites of the later Umayyad period. The Muʿtazilites also maintained that justice and reason must form the foundation of the action God takes toward men. Both of these doctrines were repudiated by the later orthodox school of the Ashʿarites.

Mihna
The persecution campaign, nonetheless, cost them their theology and generally, the sympathy of the Muslim masses in the Abbasid state. As the number of Muslims increased throughout the Abbasid Caliphate, and in reaction to the excesses of this newly imposed rationalism, theologians began to lose ground. The problem was exacerbated by the Mihna, the inquisition launched under the Abbasid Caliph al-Ma'mun (died 218 AH/833 AD).

The movement reached its political height during the Mihna, the period of religious persecution instituted by the 'Abbasid Caliph al-Ma'mun in AD 833 in which religious scholars (such as Sunnis and Shias) were punished, imprisoned, or even killed unless they conformed to Muʿtazila doctrine. The policy lasted for 18 years (833–851 CE) as it continued through the reigns of al-Ma'mun's immediate successors, al-Mu'tasim and al-Wathiq, and the first four years of the reign of al-Mutawakkil, who reversed the policy in 851.

Ahmad ibn Hanbal, the Sunni jurist and founder of the Hanbali school of thought was a victim of al-Ma'mun's Mihna. Due to his rejection of al-Ma'mun's demand to accept and propagate the Muʿtazila creed, ibn Hanbal was imprisoned and tortured by the Abbasid rulers.

Post-Mihna
Under Caliph al-Mutawakkil (847–861), "who sought to reestablish the traditional Moslem faith" (he intentionally wanted to restore his legitimacy due to the backlash towards Ahmad ibn Hanbal's persecution under previous Caliphs), Muʿtazilite doctrine was repudiated and Mu'tazilite professors were persecuted; Shia Muslims, Christians and Jews were also persecuted.

However, the Mu’tazila flourished under the Umayyads in al-Andalus, and the leading elite figures of the Graeco-Arabic translation movement during the reign of Al-Hakam II were followers of the Mu’tazila and Ibn Masarra.

The school of thought also flourished to some extent during the rule of the Buyids in Iraq and Persia.

Beliefs

The Five Principles
According to a "leading Muʿtazilite authority" of the end of the ninth century (Al-Khayyat), and "clearly enunciated for the first time by Abu al-Hudhayl", five basic tenets make up the Mu'tazilite creed:
monotheism,
justice and unity,
the inevitability of the threats and promises of God (or "the warning and the promise"),
the intermediary position (i.e. Muslims who die without repentance after committing a grave sin are neither mu'mineen (believers), nor kuffar (non-believers), but in an intermediate position known as fasiq),
the injunction of right, and the prohibition of wrong.

1. Monotheism

All Muslim schools of theology faced the dilemma of affirming divine transcendence and divine attributes, without falling into anthropomorphism on the one hand or emptying scriptural references to those attributes of all concrete meaning.

The doctrine of Tawhīd, in the words of the prominent Muʿtazili scholar Chief Justice Qadi Abd al-Jabbar (died 415 AH/1025 AD) is:  the knowledge that God, being unique, has attributes that no creature shares with him. This is explained by the fact that you know that the world has a creator who created it and that: he existed eternally in the past and he cannot perish while we exist after being non-existent and we can perish. And you know that he was and is eternally all-powerful and that impotence is not possible for him. And you know that he is omniscient of the past and present and that ignorance is not possible for him. And you know that he knows everything that was, everything that is, and how things that are not would be if they were. And you know that he is eternally in the past and future living, and that calamities and pain are not possible for him. And you know that he sees visible things, and perceives perceptibles, and that he does not have need of sense organs. And you know that he is eternally past and in future sufficient and it is not possible for him to be in need. And you know that he is not like physical bodies, and that it is not possible for him to get up or down, move about, change, be composite, have a form, limbs and body members. And you know that he is not like the accidents of motion, rest, color, food or smells. And you know that he is One throughout eternity and there is no second beside him, and that everything other than he is contingent, made, dependent, structured, and governed by someone/thing else. Thus, if you know all of that you know the oneness of God.

2. Divine justice
Facing the problem of existence of evil in the world, the Muʿtazilis pointed at the free will of human beings, so that evil was defined as something that stems from the errors in human acts. God does nothing ultimately evil, and he demands not from any human to perform any evil act. If man's evil acts had been from the will of God, then punishment would have been meaningless, as man performed the will of God no matter what he did. Muʿtazilis did not deny the existence of suffering that goes beyond human abuse and misuse of their free will granted to them by God. In order to explain this type of "apparent" evil, Muʿtazilis relied on the Islamic doctrine of taklif — "God does not order/give the soul of any of his creation, that which is beyond its capacity." [Qur'an 2:286] This entailed the existence of an "act of god" to serve a greater good, or the existence of evil acts to prevent a far greater evil. In conclusion, it comprised life is an ultimate "fair test" of coherent and rational choices, having a supremely just accountability in one's current state, as well as the hereafter.

Humans are required to have belief, iman, secure faith and conviction in and about God, and do good works, amal saleh, to have iman reflected in their moral choices, deeds, and relationship with God, fellow humans, and all of the creation in this world. If everyone is healthy and wealthy, then there will be no meaning for the obligations imposed on humans to, for example, be generous, help the needy, and have compassion for the deprived and trivialized. The inequalities in human fortunes and the calamities that befell them are, thus, an integral part of the test of life. Everyone is being tested. The powerful, the rich, and the healthy are required to use all their powers and privileges to help those who suffer and to alleviate their suffering. In the Qiyamah (Judgment Day), they will be questioned about their response to Divine blessings and bounties they enjoyed in their lives. The less fortunate are required to patiently persevere and are promised a compensation for their suffering that, as the Qur'an puts it in 39:10, and as translated by Muhammad Asad, is "beyond all reckoning".

The test of life is specifically for adults in full possession of their mental faculties. Children may suffer, and are observed to suffer, given the nature of life but they are believed to be completely free from sin and liability. Divine justice is affirmed through the theory of compensation. All sufferers will be compensated. This includes non-believers and, more importantly, children, who are destined to go to Paradise.

The doctrine of 'Adl in the words of ʿAbd al-Jabbar: It is the knowledge that God is removed from all that is morally wrong (qabih) and that all his acts are morally good (hasana). This is explained by the fact that you know that all human acts of injustice (zulm), transgression (jawr), and the like cannot be of his creation (min khalqihi). Whoever attributes that to him has ascribed to him injustice and insolence (safah) and thus strays from the doctrine of justice. And you know that God does not impose faith upon the unbeliever without giving him the power (al-qudra) for it, nor does he impose upon a human what he is unable to do, but he only gives to the unbeliever to choose unbelief on his own part, not on the part of God. And you know that God does not will, desire or want disobedience. Rather, he loathes and despises it and only wills obedience, which he wants and chooses and loves. And you know that he does not punish the children of polytheists (al-mushrikin) in Hellfire because of their fathers' sin, for he has said: "Each soul earns but its own due" (Qur'an 6:164); and he does not punish anyone for someone else's sin because that would be morally wrong (qabih), and God is far removed from such. And you know that he does not transgress his rule (hukm) and that he only causes sickness and illness in order to turn them to advantage. Whoever says otherwise has allowed that God is iniquitous and has imputed insolence to him. And you know that, for their sakes, he does the best for all of his creatures, upon whom he imposes moral and religious obligations (yukallifuhum), and that He has indicated to them what he has imposed upon them and clarified the path of truth so that we could pursue it, and he has clarified the path of falsehood (tariq l-batil) so that we could avoid it. So, whoever perishes does so only after all this has been made clear. And you know that every benefit we have is from God; as he has said: "And you have no good thing that is not from Allah" (Qur'an 16:53); it either comes to us from him or from elsewhere. Thus, when you know all of this you become knowledgeable about justice from God.

3. The Promise and the Threat [al-wa'd wa l-wa'id]
This comprised questions of the Last day, or in Arabic, the Qiyamah (Day of Judgment). According to 'Abd al-Jabbar, The doctrine of irreversible Divine promises and warnings, is fashioned out the Islamic philosophy of human existence. Humans, (or insan in Arabic) are created with an innate need in their essence to submit themselves to something. Also, it is seen as an innate need of all humans to pursue an inner peace and contentment within the struggles of an imperfect world. Knowledge of God, truth, and choices, in relation to one's innate need of submission is seen in Islam as the promise and recompense of God (al-thawab) to those who follow. His warning is looked at as a conscious decision by a human submitting themselves, and choosing a varying principle which he had given a clear warning to. He will not go back on his word, nor can he act contrary to his promise and warning, nor lie in what he reports, in contrast to what the Postponers (Murjites) hold.

4. The Intermediate Position [Al-Manzilah bayn al-manzilatayn]

That is, Muslims who commit grave sins and die without repentance are not considered as mu’minīn (believers), nor are they considered kafirs (non-believers), but in an intermediate position between the two, (fasiq). The reason behind this is that a mu’min is, by definition, a person who has faith and conviction in and about God, and who has his/her faith reflected in his/her deeds and moral choices. Any shortcoming on any of these two fronts makes one, by definition, not a mu’min. On the other hand, one does not become a kafir (i.e. rejecter; non-believer), for this entails, inter alia, denying the Creator — something not necessarily done by a committer of a grave sin. The fate of those who commit grave sins and die without repentance is Hell. Hell is not considered a monolithic state of affairs but as encompassing many degrees to accommodate the wide spectrum of human works and choices, and the lack of comprehension associated to The Ultimate Judge (one of the other names in Islam of God.) Consequently, those in the intermediate position, though in Hell, would have a lesser punishment because of their belief and other good deeds. Muʿtazilites adopted this position as a middle ground between Kharijites and Murjites. In the words of ʿAbd al-Jabbar, the doctrine of the intermediate position is the knowledge that whoever murders, or commits zina, or commits serious sins is a grave sinner (fasiq) and not a believer, nor is his case the same that of believers with respect to praise and attributing greatness, since he is to be cursed and disregarded. Nonetheless, he is not an unbeliever who cannot be buried in our Muslim cemetery, or be prayed for, or marry a Muslim. Rather, he has an intermediate position, in contrast to the Seceders (Kharijites) who say that he is an unbeliever, or the Murjites who say that he is a believer.

5. The enjoining of right and prohibiting of wrong
These two tenets, like the "intermediate position" follow logically (according to scholar Majid Fakhry) from the basic Muʿtazilite concepts of divine unity, justice and free will, of which they are the logical conclusion. Even though they are accepted by most Muslims, Muʿtazilites give them a specific interpretation in the sense that, even though God enjoins what is right and prohibits what is wrong, the use of reason allows a Muslim in most cases to identify for himself what is right and what is wrong, even without the help of revelation. Only for some acts is the revelation necessary to determine whether a certain act is right or wrong. This is discussed in further details below.

Theory of interpretation
Muʿtazilah relied on a synthesis between reason and revelation. That is, their rationalism operated in the service of scripture and Islamic theological framework. They, as the majority of Muslim jurist-theologians, validated allegorical readings of scripture whenever necessary. Justice ʿAbd al-Jabbar (935–1025) said in his Sharh al-Usul al-Khamsa (The Explication of the Five Principles):

The hermeneutic methodology proceeds as follows: if the literal meaning of an ayah (verse) is consistent with the rest of scripture, the main themes of the Qur'an, the basic tenets of the Islamic creed, and the well-known facts, then interpretation, in the sense of moving away from the literal meaning, is not justified. If a contradiction results from adopting the literal meaning, such as a literal understanding of the "hand" of God that contravenes his transcendence and the Qur'anic mention of his categorical difference from all other things, then an interpretation is warranted. In the above quote, Justice 'Abd al-Jabbar emphatically mentioned that if there are two possible interpretations, both capable of resolving the apparent contradiction created by literal understanding of a verse, then the interpretation closer to the literal meaning should take precedence, for the relationship between the interpretations, close and distant, becomes the same as the literal understanding and the interpretation.

The first obligation

Muʿtazilis believed that the first obligation on humans, specifically adults in full possession of their mental faculties, is to use their intellectual power to ascertain the existence of God, and to become knowledgeable of his attributes. One must wonder about the whole existence, that is, about why something exists rather than nothing. If one realises that there is a being who caused this universe to exist, not reliant on anything else and absolutely free from any type of need, then one realizes that this being is all-wise and morally perfect. If this being is all-wise, then his very act of creation cannot be haphazard or in vain. One must then be motivated to ascertain what this being wants from humans, for one may harm oneself by simply ignoring the whole mystery of existence and, consequently, the plan of the Creator. This paradigm is known in Islamic theology as wujub al-nazar, i.e., the obligation to use one's speculative reasoning to attain ontological truths. About the "first duty," ʿAbd al-Jabbar said it is "speculative reasoning (al-nazar) which leads to knowledge of God, because he is not known by the way of necessity (daruratan) nor by the senses (bi l-mushahada). Thus, he must be known by reflection and speculation."

The difference between Muʿtazilis and other Muslim theologians is that Muʿtazilis consider al-nazar an obligation even if one does not encounter a fellow human being claiming to be a messenger from the Creator, and even if one does not have access to any alleged God-inspired or God-revealed scripture. On the other hand, the obligation of nazar to other Muslim theologians materializes upon encountering prophets or scripture.

Reason and revelation

The Muʿtazilis had a nuanced theory regarding reason, Divine revelation, and the relationship between them. They celebrated power of reason and human intellectual power. To them, it is the human intellect that guides a human to know God, his attributes, and the very basics of morality. Once this foundational knowledge is attained and one ascertains the truth of Islam and the Divine origins of the Qur'an, the intellect then interacts with scripture such that both reason and revelation come together to be the main source of guidance and knowledge for Muslims. Harun Nasution in the Muʿtazila and Rational Philosophy, translated in Martin (1997), commented on Muʿtazili extensive use of rationality in the development of their religious views saying: "It is not surprising that opponents of the Muʿtazila often charge the Muʿtazila with the view that humanity does not need revelation, that everything can be known through reason, that there is a conflict between reason and revelation, that they cling to reason and put revelation aside, and even that the Muʿtazila do not believe in revelation. But is it true that the Muʿtazila are of the opinion that everything can be known through reason and therefore that revelation is unnecessary? The writings of the Muʿtazila give exactly the opposite portrait. In their opinion, human reason is not sufficiently powerful to know everything and for this reason humans need revelation in order to reach conclusions concerning what is good and what is bad for them."

The Muʿtazili position on the roles of reason and revelation is well captured by what Abu al-Hasan al-Ash'ari (died 324 AH/935 AD), the eponym of the Ashʿari school of theology, attributed to the Mu'tazili scholar Ibrahim an-Nazzam (died 231 AH/845 AD) (1969):

In the above formulation, a problem emerged, which is rendering something obligatory on the Divine being — something that seems to directly conflict with Divine omnipotence. The Muʿtazili argument is predicated on absolute Divine power and self-sufficiency, however. Replying to a hypothetical question as to why God does not do that which is ethically wrong (la yaf`alu al-qabih), 'Abd al-Jabbar replied: Because he knows the immorality of all unethical acts and that he is self-sufficient without them...For one of us who knows the immorality of injustice and lying, if he knows that he is self-sufficient without them and has no need of them, it would be impossible for him to choose them, insofar as he knows of their immorality and his sufficiency without them. Therefore, if God is sufficient without need of any unethical thing it necessarily follows that he would not choose the unethical based on his knowledge of its immorality. Thus every immoral thing that happens in the world must be a human act, for God transcends doing immoral acts. Indeed, God has distanced himself from that with his saying: "But Allah wills no injustice to his servants" (Qur'an 40:31), and his saying: "Verily Allah will not deal unjustly with humankind in anything" (Qur'an 10:44).

The thrust of ʿAbd al-Jabbar's argument is that acting immorally or unwisely stems from need and deficiency. One acts in a repugnant way when one does not know the ugliness of one's deeds, i.e., because of lack of knowledge, or when one knows but one has some need, material, psychological, or otherwise. Since God is absolutely self-sufficient (a result from the cosmological "proof" of his existence), all-knowing, and all-powerful, he is categorically free from any type of need and, consequently, he never does anything that is ridiculous, unwise, ugly, or evil.

The conflict between Muʿtazilis and Ashʿaris concerning this point was a matter of focus. Muʿtazilis focused on divine justice, whereas the Ashʿaris focused on divine omnipotence. Nevertheless, Divine self-restraint in Muʿtazili discourse is part of divine omnipotence, not a negation of it.

Validity of hadith

During the Abbasid dynasty, the poet, theologian, and jurist, Ibrahim an-Nazzam founded a madhhab called the Nazzamiyya that rejected the authority of Hadiths by Abu Hurayra. His famous student, Al-Jahiz, was also critical of those who followed such Hadiths, referring to his Hadithist opponents as al-nabita ("the contemptible").

According to Racha El Omari, early Mutazilites believed that hadith were susceptible to "abuse as a polemical ideological tool"; that the matn (content) of the hadith—not just the isnad—ought to be scrutinized for doctrine and clarity; that for hadith to be valid they ought to be mutawatir, i.e. supported by tawātur or many isnād (chains of oral transmitters), each beginning with a different Companion.

In writing about mutawatir (multi-isnād Hadith) and ahad (single-isnad hadith, i.e. almost all hadith) and their importance from the legal theoretician's point of view, Wael Hallaq notes the medieval scholar Al-Nawawi (1233–1277) argued that any non-mutawatir hadith is only probable and can not reach the level of certainty that a mutawatir hadith can. However, these mutawir were extremely scarce. Scholars like Ibn al-Salah (died 1245 CE), al-Ansari (died 1707 CE), and Ibn ‘Abd al-Shakur (died 1810 CE) found "no more than eight or nine" hadiths that fell into the mutawatir category.

Wāṣil ibn ʿAṭāʾ (700–748 CE, by many accounts a founder of the Mutazilite school of thought), held that there was evidence for the veracity of a report when it had four independent transmitters. His assumption was that there could be no agreement between all transmitters in fabricating a report. Wāṣil’s acceptance of tawātur seems to have been inspired by the juridical notion of witnesses as proof that an event did indeed take place. Hence, the existence of a certain number of witnesses precluded the possibility that they were able to agree on a lie, as opposed to the single report which was witnessed by one person only, its very name meaning the  "report of one individual" (khabar al-wāḥid). Abū l-Hudhayl al-ʿAllāf (died 227/841) continued this verification of reports through tawātur, but proposed that the number of witnesses required for veracity be twenty, with the additional requirement that at least one of the transmitters be a believer.

For Ibrahim an-Nazzam (c. 775 – c. 845), both the single and the mutawātir hadith reports as narrated by Abu Hurayra, the most prolific hadith narrater, could not be trusted to yield knowledge. He recounted contradictory ḥadīth from Abu Hurayra and examined their divergent content (matn) to show why they should be rejected: they relied on both faulty human memory and bias, neither of which could be trusted to transmit what is true. Al-Naẓẓām bolstered his strong refutation of the trustworthiness of ḥadīths narrated by Abu Hurayra within the larger claim that his ḥadīths circulated and thrived to support polemical causes of various theological sects and jurists, and that no single transmitter could by himself be held above suspicion of altering the content of a single report. Al-Naẓẓām’s skepticism involved far more than excluding the possible verification of a report narrated by Abu Hurayra, be it single or mutawātir. His stance also excluded the trustworthiness of consensus, which proved pivotal to classical Muʿtazilite criteria devised for verifying the single report (see below). Indeed, his shunning of both consensus and tawātur as narrated by Abu Hurayra earned him a special mention for the depth and extent of his skepticism.

Atomism

Mutazilite ideas of God were underpinned by the Ancient Greek doctrine of atomism. This is the belief that all things and processes are reducible to fundamental physical particles and their arrangements.

Mutazilite atomism however did not imply determinism. Since God was ultimately responsible for manipulating the particles, his actions were not bound by the material laws of the universe. This radically sovereign God entailed an occasionalist theology: God could intervene directly in the world to produce contingent events at will. This radical freedom was possible precisely because the world was composed solely of inert matter rather than an immaterial spirit with an independent vital force of its own.

Eschatology
One of the "most sharply defined" issues where the Mu'tazila disagreed with "their theological opponents" was whether Paradise and hell (Jahannam) had already been created or if their existence was waiting for Judgement Day.
The "majority of the Mu'tazila rejected categorically" the idea that God had already created the
Garden and the Fire on the grounds that "the physical universe does not allow for their existence yet". They also argued that because the Qur'anic described  everything in the universe except God being  destroyed (the great fanāʾ) "between the trumpet blasts" before Judgement Day, it would be more sensible to assume that the two abodes of the afterlife would be created after the great fanāʾ 

A number of ḥadīth promise that viewing that face of God (wajh Allah) will be part of the reward of the faithful in paradise.  However, the Mu'tazila, aside from their skepticism of ḥadīth, argued that if "God was an immaterial substance", as they believed he was, He was "by definition" not visible.

Contemporary Mu'tazilism

Today, Mu‘tazilism persists mainly in the Maghreb among those who call themselves the Wasiliyah. Referring to Wasil ibn Ata the reputed founder of Mu‘tazila, the movement uses the mantle of the Mu‘tazila primarily as an identity marker.

The Arab Islamic philosopher Ismail al-Faruqi, widely recognised by his peers as an authority on Islam and comparative religion, was deeply influenced by the Mu'tazila.

The pan-Islamist revolutionary Jamal al-Din al-Afghani, was noted for embracing Mu’tazilite views. His student Muhammad Abduh (1849–1905) was one of the key founding figures of Islamic Modernism that contributed to a revival of Muʿtazilite thought in Egypt, although he himself does not seem to have called himself a Muʿtazilite. After he was appointed Grand Mufti of Egypt in 1899, he attempted to adapt Islam to the modern times and to introduce changes in the teachings at Al-Azhar University. Although his reforms were disputed by  traditional Sunni establishment as well as his immediate successors such as Muhammad Rashid Rida (1865–1935 C.E), 'Abduh would become the chief source of inspiration for later modernist and reformist scholars and philosophers such as Fazlur Rahman (1919–1988), Farid Esack (born 1959), and in particular Harun Nasution (1919–1998) and Nasr Abu Zayd (1943–2010).

The Association for the Renaissance of Mu'tazilite Islam (ARIM) was founded in France in February 2017 by Eva Janadin and Faker Korchane.

See also

References

Bibliography

External links 
 Mu'tazila: The use of reason in Islamic theology
 Association pour la renaissance de l'Islam mutazilite (ARIM)

 
Islamic philosophical schools
Abbasid Caliphate
Rationalism
Islamic branches